Islam Abou Ouffa (born April 22, 1990) is an Egyptian professional footballer who currently plays as a defensive midfielder for the Egyptian club Ala'ab Damanhour. Abo-Ouffa succeeded with Ala'ab Damanhour to promote to 2014–15 Egyptian Premier League, and then moved to Haras El Hodoud and played only one season before moving to El Raja SC where they succeeded again to get promoted to 2017–18 Egyptian Premier League, but he then moved back to Ala'ab Damanhour in Egyptian Second Division with a 2-year contract.

References 

1990 births
Living people
El Raja SC players
Egyptian footballers
Association football midfielders
Ala'ab Damanhour SC players
Haras El Hodoud SC players